Unrest is a 2017 documentary film produced and directed by Jennifer Brea. The film tells the story of how Jennifer and her new husband faced an illness that struck Jennifer just before they married.

Synopsis
Jennifer Brea is a Harvard PhD student about to marry the love of her life, when she is struck down by a fever that leaves her bedridden. Months before her wedding, she becomes progressively more ill, eventually losing the ability even to sit in a wheelchair. When doctors tell her it's "all in her head", she goes online and finds a hidden world of millions confined to their homes and bedrooms by myalgic encephalomyelitis (ME), also commonly called chronic fatigue syndrome (CFS).

Unrest tells the story of Jennifer and her husband Omar Wasow, as newlyweds grappling with how to live in the face of a lifelong illness. In search of answers and initially bedbound, Jennifer sets off on a virtual voyage around the world, meeting four extraordinary ME patients in the US, UK, and Denmark. Their bedrooms connected by Skype and Facebook, these patients teach Jen how to make a life of meaning when everything changes.

Unrest is a first-person story of resilience in the face of life-altering loss, exploring how we treat people with illnesses we do not yet understand — how confronting the fragility of life teaches us its value and, ultimately, how we all have the need to find community and connection.

Production
The production of Unrest began when Brea picked up the camera to film her symptoms because she was being dismissed by doctors in the spring of 2012.

Brea used a Skype teleprompter to conduct interviews, and eventually found a way to stream an on-set camera to her computer. Gradually, she built a global team. The whole process took four years. She was bedridden throughout much of the production of the film, conducting interviews on Skype and directing remotely with producers and crews around the world. The film is a combination of professionally shot vérité, self-filmed iPhone videos, and interviews conducted via Skype.

Release
The film premiered at the 2017 Sundance Film Festival on January 20. It was screened during the 2017 SXSW Film Festival in March; The Melbourne International Film Festival August 2017; New Zealand International Film Festival August 2017; Sheffield Doc Fest; CPH:Dox; and Hotdocs. In fall of 2017, the film opened theatrically in the United States and United Kingdom.

The film aired in the United States as part of the Independent Lens series on the Public Broadcasting Service in January 2018. It became available to view on Netflix on January 15, 2018.

Reception
The film was well-received. The Los Angeles Times called the film, "sensitive and arresting rally cry for increased awareness about this disease, and an existential exploration of the meaning of life while battling a crippling chronic illness...remarkably intimate, deeply edifying and a stirring call to action."

Unrest was shortlisted for the Academy Award for best documentary feature, but was not one of the final five nominations.

Awards
 2017 Sundance Film Festival U.S. Documentary Special Jury Award For Editing
 2017 Sheffield Doc/Fest Illuminate Award

References

External links
 
 Unrest at Independent Lens on PBS
 Unrest at Sundance website
 

2017 films
American documentary films
2017 documentary films
Documentary films about women
Documentary films about science
Documentary films about the history of science
Documentary films about people with disability
Documentary films about health care
American independent films
Chronic fatigue syndrome
2017 directorial debut films
Films about activists
Films scored by Bear McCreary
2010s English-language films
2010s American films